The Carpenter Building is a historic commercial building at 136 East Main Street in Gentry, Arkansas.  Built in 1927–29, it is a single-story masonry structure, its exterior finished mainly in red brick and hollow clay tile.  A stepped parapet obscures the flat roof, and the front facade is inset with square pier supports, giving the impression of a portico.  The interior includes surviving original sections of tin ceilings.  The building originally housed a retail grocery, as well as a mortuary and funeral chapel, but has since been repurposed to other uses.

The building was listed on the National Register of Historic Places in 2018.

See also
National Register of Historic Places listings in Benton County, Arkansas

References

Commercial buildings on the National Register of Historic Places in Arkansas
Commercial buildings completed in 1904
1904 establishments in Arkansas
National Register of Historic Places in Benton County, Arkansas
Gentry, Arkansas